Archaebranchinecta barstowensis is a species of fairy shrimp (Anostraca) that inhabited California during the Middle Miocene. Its fecal material is abundant in the concretions from the Barstow Formation. A limited number of whole specimens have been found, and they represent the "best-preserved fossil anostracan known to date". The closest relative of A. barstowensis appears to be Archaebranchinecta pollicifera from the surroundings of Lake Titicaca, and the two have been separated from the genus Branchinecta as the new genus Archaebranchinecta.

References

Anostraca
Miocene crustaceans
Miocene animals of North America
Prehistoric arthropods of North America
Fauna of the Mojave Desert
Miocene California
Fossil taxa described in 2001
Crustaceans described in 2001